The Oswego Formation is a geologic formation in West Virginia. It dates back to the Ordovician period.

References

 Generalized Stratigraphic Chart for West Virginia

Ordovician West Virginia